The 1980 United States presidential election in New Hampshire took place on November 4, 1980, as part of the 1980 United States presidential election, which was held throughout all 50 states and D.C. Voters chose four representatives, or electors to the Electoral College, who voted for president and vice president.

New Hampshire was won by the Republican nominees, former actor and Governor Ronald Reagan of California and former CIA Director George H.W. Bush of Texas. Reagan and Bush defeated the Democratic nominees, incumbent President Jimmy Carter of Georgia and his running mate incumbent Vice President Walter Mondale of Minnesota. Also in the running was former Republican Congressman John B. Anderson of Illinois, who ran as an Independent with former Ambassador and Governor Patrick Lucey of Wisconsin.

Reagan took 57.74% of the vote to Carter's 30.95%, a margin of 29.39%. Anderson finished in a relatively strong third for a third party candidate, receiving 12.94% of the vote.

The already embattled incumbent Democratic president Carter was hurt in the state by the strong third party candidacy of John Anderson, a liberal Republican Congressman who ran in 1980 as an independent after failing to win the Republican Party's own presidential nomination. Anderson proved very popular with liberal and moderate voters in New England who normally leaned Democratic but were dissatisfied with the policies of the Carter Administration and viewed Reagan as too far to the right. The defection of these voters would push Carter below 30% of the vote and greatly widen Reagan's margin of victory over Carter in New Hampshire. New England overall would prove to be Anderson's strongest region in the nation, with all 6 New England states giving double-digit percentages to Anderson. In fact, New Hampshire would prove to be Anderson's fourth strongest state in the nation after Massachusetts, Vermont and Rhode Island, his 12.94% of the vote in the state was nearly double the 6.61% he got nationwide.

New Hampshire in this era normally leaned Republican; in 1976, the state had been won comfortably by moderate Republican Gerald Ford, who took 54.75% of the vote to Carter's 43.47%, a GOP victory margin of 11.28%, even as Carter narrowly won the election nationwide.

However the challenger Reagan would prove to be unusually popular among New Hampshire voters. Reagan won most Northeastern states by single-digit margins and with pluralities of less than 50% of the vote, potentially making Anderson, who took double-digit support, a spoiler that cost Carter victories in many of these normally liberal states. In neighboring Vermont, Reagan won the state with only 44% of the vote and a margin of 5.96%. Reagan won neighboring Maine by an even smaller 3.36% margin. Relative to the nation, Vermont would trend Democratic by 17 points and Maine would trend Democratic by over 9 points in the 1980 election. However New Hampshire, sandwiched in the middle, had a unique conservative streak to its politics for a Northeastern state. New Hampshire would ultimately be the only state in New England to give Reagan an absolute majority of the vote, with a commanding 57.74%. The state would trend 6 points toward the GOP relative to the nation in the 1980 election.

On the county map, Reagan swept all 10 of New Hampshire's counties, the only state in the Northeast to have all of its counties give majorities to Reagan. Reagan broke 60% of the vote in 3 counties.

One notable county result in 1980 that reflected both Reagan's unique popularity in New Hampshire as well as Carter's 15-point drop in support in the state relative to 1976, was the result in rural Coos County in the far north of the state. In 1976, Ford had won the state comfortably while winning 9 out of the state's counties, while Carter had scored one county win with a 51–49 victory in Coös County. Carter's sole county win in 1976 would swing so dramatically as to be one of only 3 of the state's 10 counties to give Reagan more than 60% of the vote in 1980, as Reagan received 60.08% of the vote in Coös County.

Reagan's decisive victory in New Hampshire would make the state 7% more Republican than the national average in the 1980 election.

Primaries

Results

Results by county

See also
 Presidency of Ronald Reagan
 United States presidential elections in New Hampshire

References

1980
New Hamp
1980 New Hampshire elections